El Tari International Airport  is an airport in Kupang, East Nusa Tenggara, Indonesia. The airport is named after El Tari (1926–1978), the governor of East Nusa Tenggara from 1966 to 1978.  The airport's ICAO code was changed from WRKK to WATT in 2004. As of December 2018, there were at least 258 outbound flights per week from the airport.

Development
The airport is currently undergoing an expansion program. Two aero-bridge will be added and the terminal area will be expanded from current 7,400 square meters to 15,900 square meters. The terminal will be built into two floors with waiting rooms at the upper floor.

Airlines and destinations
The airport used to serve international routes to Dili and Darwin. International routes were suspended in the 1990s due to alleged human rights violations by the Indonesian Armed Forces in East Timor.The Kupang-Dili route was resumed on 15 December 2017, operated by Air Timor.

Passenger

Accidents and incidents
 On 27 November 2009, Batavia Air Flight 711, operated by a Boeing 737-400 made an emergency landing after a problem was discovered with the landing gear.
 On 2 December 2009, Merpati Nusantara Airlines Fokker 100 PK-MJD made an emergency landing when the left main gear failed to extend. There were no injuries among the passengers and crew.
 On 10 June 2013, Merpati Nusantara Airlines Flight 6517, a Xian MA60 operated by Merpati Nusantara Airlines suffered a structural failure and crashed on the runway after a hard landing. No one was killed in the crash, but 25 people were injured. 5, including the Captain, was seriously injured. An investigation by the NTSC found that the pilot moved the throttle to the way back, causing the aircraft to lose lift. The crash was the second hull loss of a Xi'an MA60 operated by Merpati.
 On 21 December 2015 a Kalstar Aviation Embraer ERJ-195 PK-KDC operating a flight from Ende to Surabaya via Kupang overshot the runway at El Tari Airport in Kupang.

References

External links
 
 

Kupang
Airports in East Nusa Tenggara
Indonesian Air Force bases